Carolyn Thompson Taylor is an American academic and politician who served in the Oklahoma House of Representatives from 1984 to 1992. Before running for office, Taylor taught AP government at Norman High School from 1979 to 1984. While in the House, she was chair of the Education Committee and Appropriations Sub-Committee on Education. She was a principal author of numerous landmark education bills involving both Higher Education and Public Schools. She also authored legislation concerning health care for children and family leave. While in office she was an adjunct professor at Oklahoma Baptist University and the University of Oklahoma. After leaving office, Taylor was vice president of academic affairs at the University Center of Tulsa (now Rogers State University) and later a distinguished professor of political science at Rogers State.

Early life and education
Taylor was born in 1957 to parents Frank and JoAnne Miller in Norman, Oklahoma and is the oldest of five children. Her parents were also born in Norman, and the majority of her family lived in the area. During her childhood, Taylor enjoyed spending time at the library, the Museum of Natural History (in its original building before Taylor was able to author legislation that funded a new building for the museum), and her grandparents' farm. From the first to fifth grade, Taylor attended a private Catholic school, but finished her education through the Norman public school system and graduated from Norman High School. After graduating from high school, Taylor attended the University of Oklahoma, where she earned a Bachelor of Arts degree in American history and teaching certificate. While attending OU, she was a member of the marching band "The Pride of Oklahoma."

Career
After graduation, Taylor was offered a job as a teacher at Norman High School. She took over one of her favorite teacher's job as the AP government teacher at the high school. Mrs. Viola Smith, Taylor's predecessor, had timed her retirement so that Taylor would be able to assume her position when she left. While teaching at Norman, Taylor became involved with helping and volunteering on campaigns of pro-education candidates. She also lobbied at the capitol on behalf of education. Taylor taught at the high school from 1979 until 1984. In the summer of 1984, she was awarded a Fulbright Scholarship to spend the summer studying politics & government in the Middle East. Around the same time, incumbent Cleta Deatherage decided not to run for reelection for State Representative in Taylor's district. Many encouraged Taylor to run for the seat and after discussing it over with the principal at Norman High School, she was given a leave of absence in order to campaign. Paula Roberts, also a teacher at Norman High School, served as campaign manager (and held the position for all four of Taylor's campaigns). Taylor's campaign was endorsed by the Oklahoma Education Association and other groups. During her election, Taylor turned down a Fulbright scholarship.

Oklahoma House of Representatives
Education Legislation

Running on a platform of education, Taylor was elected to the Oklahoma House of Representatives in 1984. While she was in the House, Taylor was the primary author of legislation establishing state matching grants for private contributions to higher education institutions to endow professorships that resulted in hundreds of millions of dollars being donated to Oklahoma institutions.

Believing that those who excel in academic excellence should receive the same scholarship opportunities as those who score touchdowns on the football field, she authored what became known as the Academic Scholars Legislation which gave a full scholarship for tuition, fees, books along with room and board to students who obtained a certain score on the ACT, SAT or similar tests. She was also the primary co-author and floor manager of HB 1017, an education funding and reform bill that brought Oklahoma out of the bottom of education funding while for the first time equalizing funding so that every child had the same amount of operating dollars following him or her regardless of which school was attended. The bill lowered class size, brought the greatest leap in teachers’ salaries in state history, and strengthened curriculum among other reforms. Additionally, Taylor successfully advocated for a statewide Higher Education bond issue that contained funding for a new building for the Sam Noble Oklahoma Museum of Natural History.

Taylor was the principal author of legislation impacting education in the area of environmental and geography education programs, scholarship and endowed chair programs, increased funding for higher education, training and standards for Boards of Regents, college internship programs, and multiple education reforms that increased funding for pre-K through high school. Additionally,

Health Care legislation
 
Concerned about Oklahoma's failure to provide adequate prenatal care to poor women, Taylor authored legislation creating the establishment of a statewide prenatal care program, as well as Soonercare, a health insurance program for children. She also authored legislation creating the state's first family leave program for state employees and authored legislation that helped to create SoonerStart, a collaborative multi-agency early intervention program for children with disabilities.

Taylor's dedication to the public was proven through her efforts while she was in office. In her time at the House of Representatives, she was able to rise to leadership in numerous committees including Chairing the Education Committee and the Education Subcommittee of the Appropriations and Budget Committee.

Later career
Taylor left the legislature in 1992 to begin her post-legislative career at the University Center of Tulsa, which later became Rogers University and is now Rogers State University. She also married and started a family with Stratton Taylor after her departure. The two moved to Claremore, Oklahoma, where Stratton lived. Since 2000 Taylor has taught political science at Rogers State University. In 2015, Taylor was selected as Teacher of the Year by the Oklahoma Political Science Association for her work at RSU.

Taylor administered the President's Leadership Class and the Washington Center Internship Program, which places students in internships located in Washington D.C. She also coordinated the Brad Henry Scholarship program at RSU, which selects RSU students to study in Swansea, Wales.

During her time at Rogers State, Taylor has also served as/on:
	NCA Committee (Chair), 1999–2001, Self Study Editor, 2004
	Strategic Planning Committee (Chair)
	Academic Policies Committee (Chair)
	Co-Coach, RSU Mind Games Academic Team
	Marketing Committee
	Academic Integrity Committee
	Assessment Committee, 1999–2000
	Mission and Program Planning Committee, 1999–2000

Books

Taylor was the primary editor and author of the book “Voices from the Heartland” which was a finalist for the 2008 Oklahoma Book of the Year. Additionally, she was a contributor to:
	Fantasy Media in the Classroom
	The Truth of Buffy: Essays on Fiction Illuminating Reality

Boards

Taylor has served numerous boards including the Board of Directors for Arvest Bank, the Oklahoma Foundation for Excellence, and the Sam Noble Oklahoma Museum of Natural History.

Achievements and awards
	Teacher of the Year, Oklahoma Political Science Association (2015)
	Oklahoma Women's Hall of Fame (2007)
	Child Advocates Hall of Fame (2003)
	Oklahoma Observer's award for Top Ten Legislators of the Year (1990, 1991, and 1992)
	Pinnacle Award from the Tulsa Commission on the Status of Women (1995)

References

External links
 Women of the Oklahoma Legislature Oral History Project -- OSU Library
 Oklahoma Women’s Hall of Fame Oral History Project – OSU Library

People from Norman, Oklahoma
University of Oklahoma alumni
Women state legislators in Oklahoma
Democratic Party members of the Oklahoma House of Representatives
American women educators
1957 births
Living people
21st-century American women